Giulio Giunta (8 January 1935 – 9 July 2010) was an Italian modern pentathlete. He competed at the 1960 Summer Olympics.

References

External links
 

1935 births
2010 deaths
Italian male modern pentathletes
Olympic modern pentathletes of Italy
Modern pentathletes at the 1960 Summer Olympics
People from Pesaro
Sportspeople from the Province of Pesaro and Urbino
20th-century Italian people